Muara Beliti is the capital of Musi Rawas, South Sumatra, Indonesia. Muara means estuary.

Subdistricts and villages
Air Lesing
Air Satan
Bumi Agung
Durian Remuk
Ketuan Jaya
Mana Resmi
Muara Beliti Baru
Pasar Muara Beliti
Pedang (Sumatra)
Satan Indah Jaya
Suro (Sumatra)
Tanah Periuk

Populated places in South Sumatra
Regency seats of South Sumatra